MRT may refer to:

Transport

Rapid Transit Systems 
 Mass Rapid Transit (disambiguation)
 MRT (Singapore) or Mass Rapid Transit, Singapore
 MRT (Bangkok) or Metropolitan Rapid Transit, Thailand
 Manila Metro Rail Transit System, Philippines

Others 
Moreton (Merseyside) railway station, England, code MRT
Moroak airport, ICAO code MRT, in the List of airports by IATA airport code: M

Computing
Multiple Render Targets, in computer graphics
mrt.exe, Windows Malicious Software Removal Tool
 Ferranti MRT (Market Research Terminal), a handheld computer

Geography
Mauritania, ISO 3166-1 alpha-3 country code
Martinique, ITU country code
Mississippi River Trail, US

Science
Mitochondrial replacement therapy
Magnetic resonance tomography, also known as Magnetic Resonance Imaging
Malignant rhabdoid tumour
Mauritius Radio Telescope
Mean radiant temperature, a measure of thermal comfort
Mean residence time of matter in a volume
Moral reconation therapy

Other uses
Macedonian Radio Television
Manor Racing team in Formula One
Marginal rate of transformation, in economics
Merrimack Repertory Theatre, a non-profit professional theatre in Lowell, Massachusetts
Tupamaro (Venezuela), a Marxist group
Midland Reporter-Telegram, a daily newspaper in Midland, Texas
Miyazaki Broadcasting, a Japanese commercial broadcaster

See also
Mississippi River and Tributaries Project (MR&T), US
Mr. T, an American actor